The Wuling Zhengcheng is a van and MPV produced by SAIC-GM-Wuling under the Wuling Motors brand. It is the largest van produced by Wuling and serves as the flagship MPV of the brand. First launched in 2015 and was produced till 2018 when the model was relaunched as the Wuling Zhengcheng Classic, making way for the upcoming second generation model.

The second generation model is longer, wider and lower compared to the first generation model while featuring a shorter wheelbase. The model is offered as 7-, 8- and 9- seater models. Styling wise, the second generation model is boxier and similar to the Wuling Hongguang Plus in terms of styling.



First generation (2014)

The Zhengcheng was launched on the Chinese car market in 2015 as the largest vehicle in the Wuling product line-up. The Zhengcheng, or ‘Journey’, is a nine-seat MPV or minibus aimed mostly at fleet and taxi companies to be used as shuttles.

Powertrain
The Wuling Zhengcheng comes with two engine options which includes a 1.5 liter engine and 1.8 liter gasoline engine, the combined fuel consumption of the 1.5 liter engine is 8.4L/100km, and the combined fuel consumption of the 1.8 liter engine is 8.8L/100km.

Second generation (2021)

The second generation Zhengcheng is longer, wider and lower. A 2-seater panel van model is also available for the second generation Zhengcheng. The second generation model was launched in August 2021.

Powertrain
The power of the second generation Zhengcheng comes from a 1.5-litre turbo engine producing a maximum power of 147hp (108kW). The model is offered as 7-, 8- and 9- seater models.

References

External links
Wuling Zhengcheng official site

Zhengcheng
Rear-wheel-drive vehicles
Vans
Minibuses
Cars introduced in 2015
2010s cars
Cars of China